In mathematics, two sequences of numbers, often experimental data, are proportional or directly proportional if their corresponding elements have a constant ratio, which is called the coefficient of proportionality or proportionality constant. Two sequences are inversely proportional if corresponding elements have a constant product, also called the coefficient of proportionality.

This definition is commonly extended to related varying quantities, which are often called variables. This meaning of variable is not the common meaning of the term in mathematics (see variable (mathematics)); these two different concepts share the same name for historical reasons.

If several pairs of variables share the same direct proportionality constant, the equation expressing the equality of these ratios is called a proportion, e.g.,  (for details see Ratio).
Proportionality is closely related to linearity.

Direct proportionality 

Given an independent variable x and a dependent variable y, y is directly proportional to x if there is a non-zero constant k such that

 

The relation is often denoted using the symbols "∝" (not to be confused with the Greek letter alpha) or "~":
  or 

For  the proportionality constant can be expressed as the ratio

 

It is also called the constant of variation or constant of proportionality.

This corresponds to linear growth.

Examples 
 If an object travels at a constant speed, then the distance traveled is directly proportional to the time spent traveling, with the speed being the constant of proportionality.
 On a map of a sufficiently small geographical area, drawn to scale distances, the distance between any two points on the map is directly proportional to the beeline distance between the two locations represented by those points; the constant of proportionality is the scale of the map.
 The force, acting on a small object with small mass by a nearby large extended mass due to gravity, is directly proportional to the object's mass; the constant of proportionality between the force and the mass is known as gravitational acceleration.
 The net force acting on an object is proportional to the acceleration of that object with respect to an inertial frame of reference. The constant of proportionality in this, Newton's second law, is the classical mass of the object.

Inverse proportionality 

The concept of inverse proportionality can be contrasted with direct proportionality. Consider two variables said to be "inversely proportional" to each other. If all other variables are held constant, the magnitude or absolute value of one inversely proportional variable decreases if the other variable increases, while their product (the constant of proportionality k) is always the same. As an example, the time taken for a journey is inversely proportional to the speed of travel.

Formally, two variables are inversely proportional (also called varying inversely, in inverse variation, in inverse proportion) if each of the variables is directly proportional to the multiplicative inverse (reciprocal) of the other, or equivalently if their product is a constant. It follows that the variable y is inversely proportional to the variable x if there exists a non-zero constant k such that
 
or equivalently,  Hence the constant "k" is the product of x and y.

The graph of two variables varying inversely on the Cartesian coordinate plane is a rectangular hyperbola. The product of the x and y values of each point on the curve equals the constant of proportionality (k). Since neither x nor y can equal zero (because k is non-zero), the graph never crosses either axis.

Hyperbolic coordinates 

The concepts of direct and inverse proportion lead to the location of points in the Cartesian plane by hyperbolic coordinates; the two coordinates correspond to the constant of direct proportionality that specifies a point as being on a particular ray and the constant of inverse proportionality that specifies a point as being on a particular hyperbola.

Computer encoding 

The Unicode characters for proportionality are the following:

See also 
 Linear map
 Correlation
 Eudoxus of Cnidus
 Golden ratio
 Inverse-square law
 Proportional font
 Ratio
 Rule of three (mathematics)
 Sample size
 Similarity
 Basic proportionality theorem
Growth 
 Linear growth
 Hyperbolic growth

Notes

References 
 Ya. B. Zeldovich,  I. M. Yaglom: Higher math for beginners, p. 34–35.
 Brian Burrell: Merriam-Webster's Guide to Everyday Math: A Home and Business Reference. Merriam-Webster, 1998, p. 85–101.
 Lanius, Cynthia S.; Williams Susan E.: PROPORTIONALITY: A Unifying Theme for the Middle Grades. Mathematics Teaching in the Middle School 8.8 (2003), p. 392–396.
 Seeley, Cathy; Schielack Jane F.: A Look at the Development of Ratios, Rates, and Proportionality. Mathematics Teaching in the Middle School, 13.3, 2007, p. 140–142.
 Van Dooren, Wim; De Bock Dirk; Evers Marleen; Verschaffel Lieven : Students' Overuse of Proportionality on Missing-Value Problems: How Numbers May Change Solutions. Journal for Research in Mathematics Education, 40.2, 2009, p. 187–211.

Mathematical terminology

Ratios